John Leslie Brownlee (born January 31, 1965) is an American lawyer who served as the United States Attorney for the Western District of Virginia from 2001 to 2008. He has since worked as the chair of the National White Collar Defense and Investigations practice at the international law firm of Holland & Knight in Washington, DC.

Early life and education

John Brownlee was born in Casper, Wyoming on January 31, 1965. His father, Les Brownlee, was an infantry officer assigned to the 101st Airborne Division. Brownlee's father began the first of two tours in Vietnam when John was six months old. His mother, Nancy Long Hoyler, was an elementary school teacher who later worked with the Fairfax County, Virginia Head Start program. He has one sister, Tracy Brownlee Carney of Falls Church, Virginia. Brownlee is married to former television news anchor and reporter, Lee Ann Necessary. They have two daughters.

Brownlee graduated from Washington and Lee University in Lexington, Virginia in 1987 and received a Bachelor of Science in business administration and accounting.

In 1994, Brownlee graduated from the William & Mary School of Law in Williamsburg, Virginia.

Career 
He served as a judicial law clerk for U.S. District Judge Samuel Grayson Wilson in Roanoke, Virginia from 1994 to 1996.

From 1997 to 2001, Brownlee served as an Assistant U.S. Attorney for the District of Columbia in Washington, DC.

Military service

Brownlee was awarded an Army ROTC scholarship and graduated a Distinguished Military Graduate from Washington and Lee University. He was commissioned as an Infantry lieutenant and graduated from the Army's Airborne and Ranger programs. He served four years on active duty in the Infantry. Brownlee attended The JAG School at the University of Virginia and entered U.S. Army JAG Corps. He received an honorable discharge in 2007 at the rank of Major.

United States Attorney

President George W. Bush, on the recommendation of U.S. Senators John Warner and George Allen, nominated Brownlee to be the United States Attorney for the Western District of Virginia in 2001. Brownlee was sworn in as U.S. Attorney on August 30, 2001 and unanimously confirmed by the U.S. Senate on October 11, 2001.

Investigation of Purdue Pharma

In May 2007, after a five-year investigation, the pharmaceutical company Purdue Pharma, LP was convicted of illegally misbranding their pain medication OxyContin. OxyContin is a Schedule II prescription pain relief medication, classified as having the highest potential for abuse of legally available drugs. Purdue and the three executives admitted that Purdue fraudulently marketed OxyContin by falsely claiming that OxyContin was less addictive, less subject to abuse, and less likely to cause withdrawal symptoms than other pain medications when there was no medical research to support these claims and without Food and Drug Administration approval of these claims. The company and executives paid over $634 million in fines, and the executives were placed on 3 years probation and ordered to perform 400 hours of community service.

While the settlement was one of the largest financial penalties ever imposed on a drug company, under pressure from Purdue lawyer Rudy Giuliani Brownlee agreed to modify the prosecution so that Purdue Pharma's holding company, Purdue Frederick, would plead to a single misbranding charge so that Purdue Pharma would not have a criminal conviction on their name, which would prevent them from doing business with the U.S. Government. Brownlee also gave Purdue Pharma immunity from further prosecution up to and for future offenses after this plea deal, continuing until 2007. As the company continued selling Oxycontin without restriction after their conviction, The New York Times claimed that "Purdue suffered a crushing defeat in May at the hands of Brownlee when the company and three top executives pleaded guilty to criminal charges."

Despite this outcome, on July 31, 2007 Mr. Brownlee testified before the U.S. Senate Judiciary Committee regarding his investigation of Purdue and its executives." During the hearing, Senator Jeff Sessions (R-AL), referring to Mr. Brownlee, stated, "you stepped up, you led the fight, you really crushed their defense ultimately, and I am sure with this much at stake, they had some of the best lawyers in America involved in defending the case. This fine young United States Attorney committed several years of his life to this case and did something nobody else has done: put an end to this OxyContin abuse, which is an absolute national problem." Senator Ben Cardin (D-MD) stated that Brownlee's work "will have a major impact on corporate conduct in our country."

National security investigation

In March 2007, after a six-year investigation, ITT Corporation, the 12th largest supplier of sophisticated defense systems to the United States military, pleaded guilty to violating the International Traffic in Arms Regulations (ITAR). ITT was convicted of illegally transferring classified and controlled night vision technology to foreign countries, including China, and agreed to pay $100 million in penalties. Brownlee was the first federal prosecutor to convict a major defense contractor of violating the ITAR.

ITT Corporation admitted that between March 2001 and August 2001, ITT Corporation exported defense related technical data to Singapore, the People's Republic of China and the United Kingdom without having first obtained a license or written authorization from the U.S. Department of State. The technical data included information about a laser counter measure known as a "light interference filter" for military night vision goggle systems.

The investigation and prosecution of ITT Corporation created important industry reaction. Global Watch, a web based Newsletter of the International Import-Export Institute called the convictions "record breaking" and "precedent setting" and claimed that Brownlee's work would have a "significant long-term impact on the trade compliance community worldwide." The Wall Street Journal wrote that Brownlee's "ITT case is bound to send shivers through the U.S. defense industry, which increasingly views international trade as vital for long-term growth."

Use of the Violence Against Women Act

On October 12, 1996, Brent Simmons drove from Florida to Harrisonburg, Virginia, and brutally murdered his ex-girlfriend Ann Olson and her boyfriend Keith O'Connell after stalking and harassing both victims for months. Simmons was prosecuted by state authorities for both murders in 1998, but the jury was unable to agree on a verdict and a mistrial was declared. Several months later, the local prosecutor allowed Simmons to enter into a plea agreement to the murders in exchange for a 20-year term of imprisonment. Simmons was scheduled to be released from prison at the age of 41.

In 2003, the newly elected Commonwealth Attorney in Harrisonburg, Marsha Garst, asked Brownlee to review the case. Garst hoped that federal authorities could do something to keep Simmons from being released. After careful study, Brownlee developed a novel legal theory by using the Violence Against Women's Act, which had been enacted only 13 days prior to the murders, and federal firearms charges.

In 2005, Brownlee charged Simmons with two counts of using a firearm during the commission of the violent crime of interstate stalking, made criminal by the 1996 Violence Against Women Act. After a 2-week trial in February 2005, the jury convicted Simmons of the two murders but was unable to reach a unanimous decision on the death penalty. Simmons was immediately sentenced by the trial court to life in prison without the possibility of parole.

First federal death penalty verdict in Western District of Virginia

In 2007, Brownlee and Assistant U.S. Attorney Tony Giorno prosecuted a federal inmate for committing a violent prison murder. The jury imposed the death penalty, the first federal death penalty conviction in the Western District of Virginia.

United States v. Frank Cassell

On November 2, 2006, a federal Grand Jury charged 20 defendants for their roles in a racketeering conspiracy that included the distribution of illegal drugs, theft of drugs and firearms under the custody of the Henry County Sheriff's Office, money laundering, and obstruction of justice. Thirteen of the twenty defendants were current or former employees of the Henry County, Virginia Sheriff's Office. Eighteen of the defendants, including the sheriff, were convicted of felony offenses, and two were placed on pre-trial diversion.

According to the indictment, since 1998, sworn officers, employees, and associates of the Henry County Sheriff's Office engaged in a continuous scheme to steal narcotics, firearms, and other contraband from the seized evidence property room. The defendants took cocaine, crack cocaine, marijuana, and firearms, and then sold the stolen drugs and guns back into the community. The Grand Jury also has alleged that several of the defendants stole seized firearms and other contraband for their own personal use.	
	
Sheriff Frank Cassell was convicted of making false statements to agents of the FBI. Specifically, Sheriff Cassell had been told of various illegal activities involving Henry County Sheriff's Deputies including the distribution of two kilograms of cocaine, embezzlement, and the use of steroids by several high-ranking members of the Henry County Sheriff's Office. Cassell covered up these illegal activities in several ways; by not pursuing investigations and by agreeing to pass on any law enforcement information to the offending parties so they could avoid apprehension, by making false statements to federal investigators and by attempting to aid former Sergeant James Alden Vaught in a money laundering scheme to disguise the source of money represented to have been derived from the distribution of cocaine. Specifically, Cassell acknowledged that he attempted to help Vaught give $10,000 of known drug proceeds the appearance of legitimacy by cosigning for a loan for Vaught. Cassell then counseled Vaught to deposit small amounts of cash into a checking account to pay off the loan. In addition, Cassell agreed with Vaught never to mention the existence of the money derived from illegal drug distribution and then lied to investigators, saying he knew nothing about Vaught's illegal drug activities.

United States v. Carl B. Hutcherson

In May 2005, Carl B. Hutcherson, the mayor of Lynchburg, Virginia, was convicted of defrauding two social security disability recipients and a charitable organization, making false statements to bank officials and federal investigators and obstruction of justice.

The evidence at trial indicated that Hutcherson and Hutcherson Funeral Home, Inc. became mired in financial difficulties, and, among other things, failed to make required tax payments to the Internal Revenue Service in an amount in excess of $100,000, failed to maintain balances in banking accounts, failed to make required payments to the City of Lynchburg, Virginia, and failed to meet other financial obligations.

In response to his financial problems, Hutcherson committed a series of criminal acts in an effort to obtain money. Specifically, Mr. Hutcherson, as the representative payee for two Social Security disability recipients for whom Hutcherson managed their financial affairs, used their Social Security benefits for his own personal use. Mr. Hutcherson used the victims' money and made cash payments to himself, purchased a television for himself, purchased a stereo for himself, purchased a mattress for another person, made a payment to an associate and purchased life insurance policies payable on the demise of Victim One with the beneficiary being Carl Hutcherson.

Also, Hutcherson, after being confronted with evidence that he stole money from his charity, provided false information to officials of the Bank of the James, the Federal Bureau of Investigation, and the federal Grand Jury.

Dismissal during U.S. attorneys controversy

Brownlee was included on the list of the second set of U.S. attorneys who were fired in 2006. He testified before the Senate that his placement on the list was related to his refusal of a request by his superiors at the DOJ to delay settlement of the Purdue Pharma case in 2006.

2009 election
In 2008, Brownlee announced that he was running for Attorney General of Virginia. At the May 30, 2009 Republican Convention, he yielded the nomination to Ken Cuccinelli.

Private practice
On July 17, 2013, it was announced that Brownlee had been retained to represent Virginia Governor and former fellow JAG Corps officer Robert F. McDonnell, with regard to a federal Grand Jury investigation.

See also
Virginia Attorney General Race, 2009

References

External links
Law Firm Website

Living people
Virginia Republicans
Virginia lawyers
Washington and Lee University alumni
William & Mary Law School alumni
United States Attorneys for the Western District of Virginia
1965 births
People from Great Falls, Virginia
People from Casper, Wyoming
The Judge Advocate General's Legal Center and School alumni